Acacus can refer to:
 Acacus (Greek mythology), King of Arcadia, and the foster-father of the infant Hermes in Greek mythology
 Acacus (phasmid), a genus of phasmids in the family Diapheromeridae 
 Tadrart Acacus, a region and mountain range in southwestern Libya